The H class are a class of diesel locomotives built by English Electric, Rocklea for the Western Australian Government Railways in 1964–1965.

History
To assist with the conversion of the  Eastern Goldfields Railway from Perth to Kalgoorlie to standard gauge, five locomotives were purchased from built English Electric. After being shipped by sea from Rocklea, they were hauled on narrow gauge to Upper Swan with the first entering service in January 1965.

After the completion of the gauge conversion project they began to haul local freight and infrastructure trains. In October 1992, H4 was scrapped with the other used as shunters at Forrestfield until withdrawn in 1996. All were sold in 1997 to SCT Logistics for use as shunters at Dynon, Islington and Kewdale.

Class List

References

Bo-Bo locomotives
English Electric locomotives
Diesel locomotives of Western Australia
Railway locomotives introduced in 1965
Standard gauge locomotives of Australia
Diesel-electric locomotives of Australia